We're All Nighters is an album made by rock musician Liam Lynch. It was originally released in 2002, and was reissued in 2008 through digital.

Background
According to Liam in Lynchland Viewer Mail Episode 10, the album was recorded at night and all the songs were written between midnight and six in the morning, which is why he titled the album "We're All Nighters". He describes the album as being experimental. This album features the first appearances of the songs "Try Me" and "Cuz You Do", which would later be re-recorded and featured on Liam's 2003 album, "Fake Songs" with Ringo Starr playing drums for both songs. The music videos for the songs "We're All Nighters" and "Try Me" appeared in Liam's podcast, Lynchland.

This album was first released in 2002 through the Sifl and Olly website, but has been out of print for several years. It was not until 2008 when it was reissued digitally through outlets such as iTunes.

Track listing
"Try Me" - 2:05
"Saturday" - 3:19
"Sacrifice" - 2:18
"Cuz You Do" - 2:18
"Shady" - 3:54
"Triggered" - 3:30
"Show Me You Know Me" - 3:24
"Tired But Walking" - 2:54
"Amazed Amazed" - 3:08
"London Morning" - 3:05
"Any Girl In That City" - 3:46
"Butter Rum" - 3:30
"All You Ever Wanted" - 3:19
"House of Cards" - 3:19
"The Run Around" - 2:51
"Make Me Want To Say It" - 4:34
"Victor" - 2:16
"Road To Heaven" - 2:38
"Soul On The Outside" - 3:43
"Rise" - 3:02
"We're All Nighters" - 2:53

Liam Lynch (musician) albums
2002 albums